Li Cuiqing is a Chinese Paralympic athlete with cerebral palsy. He represented China at the 2016 Summer Paralympics in Rio de Janeiro, Brazil and he won the bronze medal in the men's shot put F36 event.

At the 2015 World Championships in Doha, Qatar, he won the bronze medal in the men's shot put F36 event. In 2017, at the World Championships in London, United Kingdom, he won the silver medal in the men's shot put F36 event.

Achievements

References

External links 
 

Living people
Year of birth missing (living people)
Place of birth missing (living people)
Chinese male shot putters
Athletes (track and field) at the 2016 Summer Paralympics
Medalists at the 2016 Summer Paralympics
Paralympic bronze medalists for China
Paralympic medalists in athletics (track and field)
Paralympic athletes of China
Track and field athletes with cerebral palsy
21st-century Chinese people
Medalists at the 2018 Asian Para Games
Paralympic shot putters